Parocneria is a genus of tussock moths in the family Erebidae. The genus was erected by Harrison Gray Dyar Jr. in 1897.

Species
The following species are included in the genus:

References

Lymantriini
Noctuoidea genera